Rosemary Nkemjika Okafor (born 22 May 1981) is a Nigerian sprinter. She competed in the women's 4 × 400 metres relay at the 2000 Summer Olympics.

References

External links
 

1981 births
Living people
Athletes (track and field) at the 2000 Summer Olympics
Nigerian female sprinters
Olympic athletes of Nigeria
Place of birth missing (living people)
Olympic female sprinters
21st-century Nigerian women